Battle of Rabaul may refer to:
Battle of Bita Paka, a 1914 battle fought south of Kabakaul, on the island of New Britain
Siege of Toma, a bloodless action during World War I on the island of New Pomerania (now New Britain) 
Battle of Rabaul (1942)
Bombing of Rabaul (1942)
Bombing of Rabaul (November 1943)
New Britain campaign (1943–45)